Ottawa/Rockcliffe Water Aerodrome  is located adjacent to Ottawa, Ontario, Canada. It is a small airport and few Ottawans know of its existence. The airport is the home of the Canada Aviation and Space Museum, which owns the field, and is used and maintained by the Rockcliffe Flying Club.

The airport land was originally a military rifle range. In 1918 the Royal Flying Corps began using the field behind the range for experimental mail flights, and the Ottawa/Rockcliffe Airport opened officially in 1920 as the Ottawa Air Station, one of the six original airfields opened across Canada by the new Air Board.

Since it is on the shore of the Ottawa River and the runways were connected to the riverfront by a road, it was one of very few airports capable of handling and transferring floatplanes on both land and water. It only services seaplanes and its runway, is the river. It is mainly used by the military, general aviation aircraft, and by hikers, tourists and people attempting to access remote locations that are only accessible by air.

See also
List of airports in the Ottawa area

References

Registered aerodromes in Ontario
Transport in Ottawa
Seaplane bases in Ontario